Podhájí is basic housing unit of the town of Horšovský Týn in the Domažlice District, the Czech Republic. It is located 3 km southwest of Horšovský Týn. As of 2011, there were 144 registered addresses and 45 permanent residents. It was founded in 1982 as Horšovský Týn hamlet.

Description 
The basic residential unit of Podhájí originally consisted of cottages located in the forest on the western slope of Kněžská hora near the Podhájí pond. The settlement is connected by two asphalt roads to road number II/26, which leads from Horšovský Týn to Březí and onto the Folmava border crossing.

A green tourist sign leads from Horšovský Týn through Svatá Anna, Kněžský vrch, and on to Dolní Valdorf and Domažlice.

References

External links 
 

Horšovský Týn
Villages in Domažlice District